Greekstore (also, Greek Store) is an unincorporated community in Placer County, California. Greekstore is located at the head of the canyon formed by Spruce Creek.  It lies at an elevation of 5623 feet (1714 m). As of 1952, there was a guard station at the place.

References

Unincorporated communities in California
Unincorporated communities in Placer County, California